Aleko is a masculine given name, sometimes a short form of Alexandros. It may refer to:

 Alexandros Goulandris (1927–2017), Greek shipowner and philanthropist
 Aleko Konstantinov (1863–1897), Bulgarian writer
 Aleko Lilius (1890–1977), Russian-born explorer, businessman, diplomat, writer, journalist and photographer
 Aleko Prodani (1942–2006), Albanian actor
 Alexandros Schinas (c. 1870–1913), assassin of King George I of Greece
 Aleko Yordan (born 1936), Turkish former footballer

See also
 Alekos, another short form of Alexandros

Masculine given names
Hypocorisms